The Last Days is a 2013 Spanish science fiction thriller film directed by David and Àlex Pastor. The film had its world premiere on March 20, 2013, in Barcelona, and stars Quim Gutiérrez as a man who must deal with the potential end of all humanity.

Plot

Office worker Marc scavenges for food in a downtown Barcelona building that has been ravaged by a catastrophic event. Directed to the basement to help dig a tunnel, he almost causes its collapse as he panics over the fate of his girlfriend Julia, who was staying at his apartment at the time of the catastrophe. When they break through to a neighboring building, he meets his former boss Enrique, who tells Marc that they can talk later. A flashback reveals that Marc, working as a computer engineer, faced possible termination by Enrique. Afraid of losing his job, Marc resists Julia's desire to have children. The following morning, Marc watches a video of a boy who dies from suicide because his father could not understand or believe in his acute agoraphobia.

In the present, three months after the unspecified event, Marc and Enrique discuss leaving the building together. Enrique, who has a working GPS device, requests that Marc not tell the others about it; Marc reveals that he has stolen supplies formerly owned by Rovira, a dead coworker. Enrique is initially dismissive of Marc's scavenged supplies and declines to partner with him, but Marc blackmails Enrique into helping him search for Julia. The two set out into the subway system, where a young pickpocket steals the GPS device. After a chase and fight over his possessions, Enrique kills Javier, the pickpocket's brother after the power goes out. Although worried that Enrique will continue without him, Marc is relieved to find that Enrique is willing to continue their partnership.

Another flashback shows that Marc's neighbor has not left the building for months. At work, Rovira, revealed to have been covertly living in the office, is forced to leave. Once thrown out, he convulses; when dragged back in, the convulsions end, but he still dies from the trauma. Discussing these strange events at home with Julia, Marc notices that increasing numbers of people are refusing to leave their homes. In the present, Marc grows frustrated with Enrique's refusal to reveal why he wants to go to the Olympic city with a bag full of seeds. When they believe they have reached Marc's apartment building, they blast their way in with explosives. There, they learn that Julia, now pregnant, is not in the building.

Flashbacks depict a growing trend of agoraphobia called "the Panic", a disease of unknown origin that kills anyone who goes outside through convulsion. Julia and Marc fight again over whether to have children, and Julia accuses Marc of using the Panic as an excuse to avoid it. After Marc leaves for work, Julia refuses to speak to him, and he becomes stranded in the office building when he suddenly becomes agoraphobic. In the present, Enrique tells Marc that since they have reached his apartment building, he will no longer accompany Marc. Enrique reveals that he is attempting to reach the hospital where his comatose father is at, which prompts the two to reconcile somewhat. At a church, a bear nearly mauls Enrique to death, but Marc manages to kill it. While the two eat the bear, they bond over their pasts and fears.

A group of survivors inform Enrique that the hospital burnt down; since his father was in a coma, it is unlikely that he survived. Enrique falls into a deep depression and gives Marc his seeds, telling him to find Julia and save the baby. On his own, Marc ends up in a shopping center where Julia worked. He looks in the supermarket and finds a band of survivors but they are raided by another group. He finds Julia's coworker, Andrea, but she is killed by debris. Marc is attacked by a man with a knife but Enrique saves him but is severely wounded in the process, which he hides. Marc notices Julia in the opposite building. Overjoyed, he returns to tell Enrique and discovers his wounds. Urged by Enrique's dying wish, Marc crosses the street to be with Julia, though it nearly kills him.

Several months later, Julia gives birth, and they use the seeds to create a greenhouse. Over time, the child grows and is shown able to leave the building without suffering from the Panic. As this happens, he is part of a new generation of humanity that is naturally immune to the Panic. Marc and Julia watch him leaves with several other youths to rebuild civilization.

Cast
Quim Gutiérrez as Marc
José Coronado as Enrique
Marta Etura as Julia
Leticia Dolera as Andrea
Mikel Iglesias as Dani
Iván Massagué as Lucas
Pere Ventura as Rovira
Lluís Soler as Vecino
Abdelatif Hwidar as Hombre Extranjero
Farah Hamed as Mujer Extranjera
Lily Morett as Niña Extranjera
Isak Férriz as Javier
Pere Brasó as Carlos
Momo Ballesteros as Ángela
Albert Prat as Toni

Production
The Pastors announced their intent to film The Last Days in 2011 at the Sitges Film Festival, where they presented a four-minute teaser trailer. Filming took place in Barcelona on a budget of five million euros, which the Pastors stated would have had to have been larger if they shot the film in the United States. Actors Quim Gutiérrez and José Coronado were confirmed to be performing in the film, along with Marta Etura.

Reception
As of March 2015, The Last Days received positive reviews with an 91% "Fresh" rating on Rotten Tomatoes, based on eleven reviews. Dread Central praised the film's characters and visuals, and Scott Weinberg writing for Fearnet, commented: "Taken a bit less seriously, or presented with a little less heart, The Last Days could easily devolve into something silly or (even worse) boring." Jonathan Holland, writing for Variety, expressed disappointment over the film, as they felt the directors "[failed] to deliver on the promise of their 2009 English-language debut, Carriers." Shelagh M. Rowan-Legg, writing for  Twitch Film, gave the film a mixed review and wrote that, while the film had several strengths such as the story and special effects, it was ultimately "entertaining enough, but not likely to be remembered."

Box office
The film earned ¥11.46 million at the Chinese box office.

Awards

See also
 List of Spanish films of 2013
 The Exterminating Angel

References

External links
 
 

2013 films
2010s science fiction thriller films
Spanish science fiction thriller films
2010s Spanish-language films
Spanish post-apocalyptic films
Films set in Barcelona
Films shot in Barcelona
Films about viral outbreaks
2010s pregnancy films
Films directed by Àlex and David Pastor
Spanish pregnancy films
2010s Spanish films